George Lewis Igaba-Ishimwe Maniraguha (born 16 June 2000) is a Rwandan-born Norwegian professional footballer who plays as a forward for  club Arsenal.

Early life
Born in Kigali, Rwanda, Lewis moved to Tanzania at the age of one. He then moved to Norway the age of four, starting his career at local side Stakkevollan IF, before moving to Tromsdalen, and later Tromsø in 2015. He mostly played for the reserve teams of both clubs, notably notching 32 goals in 35 appearances over three seasons for Tromsdalen's reserve team.

Club career
Lewis went on trial with English Premier League side Arsenal in March 2020, having previously trained with local side Solihull United, as well as Bournemouth and Ipswich Town.

Lewis joined Arsenal in August 2020, signing a professional contract]. He reportedly signed a two year deal with the North London club. The move was seen as a surprise, as Lewis had only played in the Norwegian second and third divisions, and has no youth international caps.

He scored in his first appearance for Arsenal's under-21 side, in a 2–1 win over Ipswich Town in the EFL Trophy.

International career
Eligible to represent both Rwanda and Norway, Lewis has stated that he is Norwegian, having grown up in Tromsø.

Career statistics

Club
.

References

2000 births
Living people
People from Kigali
Rwandan footballers
Norwegian footballers
Norwegian people of Rwandan descent
Association football forwards
Tromsdalen UIL players
Tromsø IL players
IF Fram Larvik players
Arsenal F.C. players
Rwandan expatriate footballers
Norwegian expatriate footballers
Norwegian expatriate sportspeople in England
Expatriate footballers in England